Siskonmakkara is a mild, Finnish fresh sausage made of pork, cooked before serving. The meat is soft and smooth-textured and usually squeezed from its casing when cooking. The most common dish using this sausage is siskonmakkara soup (siskonmakkarakeitto) in which they are cooked in, and simultaneously flavours, the soup stock.  The sausage can also be used for a stroganoff or macaroni casserole in place of minced meat. It does not keep well and should be used on the day it is bought.

The word siskonmakkara is a partial loan translation from the Swedish compound word siskonkorv (korv meaning "sausage") whose siskon part had originally been susiskon, derived from German Sausischen and French saucisse, both meaning "small sausage". The word siskon is a homonym of the genitive form of the word sisko meaning "sister", as the word siskonmakkara appears to mean "sister’s sausage".

See also

 List of sausage dishes

References

External links
Glossary of Finnish dishes

Finnish sausages
Fresh sausages
Sausage dishes